Tibouchina melastomoides is a species of flowering plant in the family Melastomataceae, native to Brazil. It was first described in 1850, as Lasiandra melastomoides, by Charles Victor Naudin. The type specimen is kept in Naturhistorisches Museum Wien in Austria.

References

melastomoides
Flora of Brazil
Plants described in 1850